Hans Eder (26 March 1927, in Bad Gastein – 28 April 2008 in Qualicum Beach, Canada) was an Austrian Nordic skier who competed during the 1950s.

Career
At the 1952 Winter Olympics in Oslo, he finished ninth in the Nordic combined event, 30th in the ski jumping individual large hill, and 31st in the 18 km cross-country skiing event.

External links
18 km Olympic cross-country results: 1948-52
Eder information at Semmering WSV 
Olympic ski jumping results: 1948-60

Austrian male cross-country skiers
Austrian male Nordic combined skiers
Austrian male ski jumpers
Olympic ski jumpers of Austria
Olympic cross-country skiers of Austria
Olympic Nordic combined skiers of Austria
Nordic combined skiers at the 1952 Winter Olympics
Cross-country skiers at the 1952 Winter Olympics
Ski jumpers at the 1952 Winter Olympics
2008 deaths
1927 births
People from St. Johann im Pongau District
Sportspeople from Salzburg (state)